The Pokémon franchise revolves around 1,015 fictional species of collectible monsters, each having unique designs, skills, and powers. Conceived by Satoshi Tajiri in early 1989, Pokémon are fictional creatures that inhabit the fictional Pokémon World. The designs for the multitude of species can draw inspiration from anything such as animals, plants, and mythological creatures. Many Pokémon are capable of evolving into more powerful species, while others can undergo form changes and achieve similar results. Originally, only a handful of artists led by Ken Sugimori designed Pokémon. However, by 2013 a team of 20 artists worked together to create new species designs. Sugimori and Hironobu Yoshida lead the team and determine the final designs. Each iteration of the series has brought about praise and criticism over the numerous fictional creatures.

The vast array of creatures is commonly divided into "Generations", with each division primarily encompassing new titles in the main video game series and often a change of handheld platform. Generation I refers to Red, Green, Blue, and Yellow; Generation II refers to Gold, Silver, and Crystal; Generation III refers to Ruby, Sapphire, FireRed, LeafGreen, and Emerald; Generation IV refers to Diamond, Pearl, Platinum, HeartGold, and SoulSilver; Generation V refers to Black, White, Black 2, and White 2; Generation VI refers to X, Y, Omega Ruby, and Alpha Sapphire; Generation VII refers to Sun, Moon, Ultra Sun, Ultra Moon, Let's Go, Pikachu!, and Let's Go, Eevee!; Generation VIII refers to Sword, Shield, Brilliant Diamond, Shining Pearl, and Legends: Arceus; and Generation IX refers to Scarlet and Violet. Each Generation is also marked by the addition of new Pokémon: 151 in Generation I in the Kanto region, 100 in Generation II in the Johto region, 135 in Generation III in the Hoenn region, 107 in Generation IV in the Sinnoh region, 156 in Generation V in the Unova region, 72 in Generation VI in the Kalos region, 88 in Generation VII in the Alola and Kanto regions, 96 in Generation VIII in the Galar and Hisui regions, and 110 in Generation IX in the Paldea region.

Due to the large number of Pokémon, listing of each species is divided into articles by generation. The 1015 Pokémon are organized by their number in the National Pokédex—an in-game electronic encyclopedia that provides various information on Pokémon. The National Pokédex is subdivided into regional Pokédex series, each revolving around species introduced at the time of their respective generations along with older generations. For example, the Johto Pokédex, Generation II, covers the 100 species introduced in Gold and Silver in addition to the original 151 species. The encyclopedias follow a general ordering: starter Pokémon are listed first, followed by species obtainable early in the respective games, and are concluded with Legendary and Mythical Pokémon. Generation V is a notable exception, as Victini is the first Pokémon in the Unova Pokédex.

Concept

Satoshi Tajiri—who later founded Game Freak—conceived the premise of Pokémon in general in 1989, when the Game Boy was released. The creatures that inhabit the world of Pokémon are also called Pokémon. The word "Pokémon" is a romanized contraction of the Japanese brand . The concept of the Pokémon universe, in both the video games and the general fictional world of Pokémon, stems most notably from Tajiri's childhood hobby of insect collecting. Other influences on the concept include Ultraman, anime, and playing video games in general. Throughout his early life, Tajiri saw his rural, nature-filled hometown (Machida, Tokyo) transform into an urban center. The urbanization of his town drove away wildlife and he and others living in the area were eventually unable to collect insects. Through Pokémon, Tajiri sought to bring back this outdoor pastime and share it with the world. The first games in the franchise, Red and Green, were released on 27 February 1996 in Japan for the Game Boy. The games were internationally released as Red and Blue in September 1998. The ability to capture, battle, trade, and care for numerous creatures catapulted Pokémon to international popularity, and it has become a multibillion-dollar franchise and the second-best selling video game series after the Mario franchise.

At the start of a main series Pokémon game, the player character receives one of three "starter" Pokémon, with which they can battle and catch other Pokémon. Each Pokémon has one or two "types", such as Fire, Water, or Grass. In battle, certain types are strong against other types. For example, a Fire-type attack will do more damage to a Grass-type Pokémon—rather than a Water-type attack. This form of gameplay is frequently compared to that of rock-paper-scissors, though players have to strategize which Pokémon and which of their attacks to use against various opponents.

Many species of Pokémon can evolve into a larger and more powerful creature. The change is accompanied by stat changes—generally a modest increase—and access to a wider variety of attacks. There are multiple ways to trigger an evolution, including reaching a particular level, using a special stone, or learning a specific attack. For example, at level 16, Bulbasaur can evolve into Ivysaur. Most notably, the Normal-type Eevee can evolve into eight different Pokémon: Jolteon (Electric), Flareon (Fire), Vaporeon (Water), Umbreon (Dark), Espeon (Psychic), Leafeon (Grass), Glaceon (Ice), and Sylveon (Fairy). In Generation VI, the games introduced a new mechanic called Mega Evolution, as well as a subset of Mega Evolution called Primal Reversion. Unlike normal evolution, Mega Evolution and Primal Reversion last only for the duration of a battle, with the Pokémon reverting to its normal form at the end. 48 Pokémon can undergo Mega Evolution or Primal Reversion as of the release of Sun and Moon. In contrast, some species such as Castform, Rotom, Unown, and Lycanroc undergo form changes, which may provide stat buffs or changes and type alterations but are not considered new species. Some Pokémon have differences in appearance due to gender. Pokémon can be male or female, male-only, female-only, or of an unknown gender.

The Pokémon franchise is primarily intended for younger players. However, each Pokémon has various complex attributes such as natures, characteristic traits, Individual Values (IVs), and Effort Values (EVs). These are intended for people "who enjoy battling and want to go more in depth", according to Game Freak Board Director Junichi Masuda. These individual statistics were also included, because the basic concept of the franchise is to train one's Pokémon. Designer Takeshi Kawachimaru stated that IVs and EVs "help to make each Pokemon in the game individual", as it adds unique aspects to them. Each Pokémon game introduces a few "Legendary" and "Mythical" Pokémon that are powerful, rare, and hard to catch. Pokémon Sun and Moon introduced "Ultra Beasts", which are described as "beings from another dimension" that appeared in the Alola region and are similarly powerful and rare.

Design and development

Throughout development of Red and Green, Ken Sugimori, a long-time friend of Tajiri, and a team of fewer than ten people, including Atsuko Nishida who is credited as the designer of Pikachu, designed all Pokémon. By 2013, a team of 20 artists worked together to create new species designs. A committee of five people determine which designs are incorporated into the games, with Sugimori and Hironobu Yoshida finalizing the look of each creature. Sugimori is also responsible for the boxart legendary Pokémon and all of the official artwork for the games. According to Yoshida, the number of rejected Pokémon designs is five to ten times more than the number that are finalized in each game. In rare cases, rejected designs are brought back and released in a later generation. Shigeru Ohmori, director of Sun and Moon, admitted that creating new Pokémon has become a difficult task with the sheer number of creatures designed over the franchise's 20-year history. Each iteration of the series has brought about praise and criticism over the numerous creatures.

The designs for Pokémon are often highly analogous to real-life creatures but also encompass inanimate objects. Director Junichi Masuda and graphic designer Takao Unno have stated that inspiration for Pokémon designs can come from anything. The variety of animals and culture around the world provide the basis for having countless ideas incorporated into the franchise. The environment that a Pokémon would live in is taken into account when they are designed. The lei-like Comfey fits appropriately in the Hawaii-inspired Alola region of Sun and Moon. Masuda has stated that each element of a design has a functioning reason. In some cases, the design team creates a footprint that a Pokémon could make and designs a creature around that. Some designers look to game mechanics for inspiration and see where particular typing combinations could be interesting. Typing assignment varies during the design process; sometimes a Pokémon receives a type after it is created and other times they are designed around a particular type. Each Pokémon has a specific height and weight.

The simpler roots of designs in Generation I prompted greater complexity in later games. Designs in general have become increasingly complex and thematic in newer games. Sneasel, for example, draws inspiration from the Japanese yōkai kamaitachi, mythical creatures with fast, razor-sharp claws that hunt in packs. These elements are all found in Sneasel's design and characteristics. New Pokémon introduced in Generation VI, for example, are heavily influenced by the culture and fauna of Europe (namely France). However, by the release of X and Y in 2013, Sugimori stated that he wishes for Pokémon design to return to the simpler roots of the franchise.

Masuda considers the starter Pokémon among the most important in the franchise. Yoshida goes further and calls them "the face of that generation" and says that "they're the ones that should be on the packaging". The three starter Pokémon of each generation are always Grass-, Water-, and Fire-types, a trio that Masuda considers the easiest to understand for new players. Their designs are based on recognizable animals and made to stand out from pre-existing Pokémon. Each are also given distinct personalities to further define them. In an interview with GamesRadar in 2009, Masuda stated that simple Pokémon take around six months to design and develop and that Pokémon that play a more important part in the games (such as starter Pokémon) may take over a year. Masuda added, "We also want the designer to have as much freedom as possible; we don't want to narrow their imagination by saying, 'We want this kind of Pokemon.' When we talk to the designer we always stress that they shouldn't think of Pokemon necessarily, but should instead just be as creative as they can." After the Pokémon is designed it is sent to the "Battle Producer", who decides which moves and stats the Pokémon should have.

Lists of Pokémon

List of species

{| class="wikitable" style="width:100%; border:2px solid grey"
|+ List of Pokémon species names by generation
|- style="border:2px solid grey"
!scope="col" colspan=2 style="border-left:2px solid grey"| Generation I
!scope="col" colspan=2 style="border-left:2px solid grey"| Generation II
!scope="col" colspan=2 style="border-left:2px solid grey"| Generation III
!scope="col" colspan=2 style="border-left:2px solid grey"| Generation IV
!scope="col" colspan=2 style="border-left:2px solid grey"| Generation V
!scope="col" colspan=2 style="border-left:2px solid grey"| Generation VI
!scope="col" colspan=2 style="border-left:2px solid grey"| Generation VII
!scope="col" colspan=2 style="border-left:2px solid grey"| Generation VIII
!scope="col" colspan=2 style="border-left:2px solid grey"| Generation IX
|- style="border:2px solid grey"
!scope="col" style="border-left:2px solid grey" | 
!scope="col" | Name
!scope="col" style="border-left:2px solid grey" | 
!scope="col" | Name
!scope="col" style="border-left:2px solid grey" | 
!scope="col" | Name
!scope="col" style="border-left:2px solid grey" | 
!scope="col" | Name
!scope="col" style="border-left:2px solid grey" | 
!scope="col" | Name
!scope="col" style="border-left:2px solid grey" | 
!scope="col" | Name
!scope="col" style="border-left:2px solid grey" | 
!scope="col" | Name
!scope="col" style="border-left:2px solid grey" | 
!scope="col" | Name
!scope="col" style="border-left:2px solid grey" | 
!scope="col" | Name
|-
| style="background-color: #9FCADF; border-left:2px solid grey" | 001
| style="background-color: #9FCADF" | Bulbasaur†
| style="background-color: #9FCADF; border-left:2px solid grey" | 152
| style="background-color: #9FCADF" | Chikorita†
| style="background-color: #9FCADF; border-left:2px solid grey" | 252
| style="background-color: #9FCADF" | Treecko†
| style="background-color: #9FCADF; border-left:2px solid grey" | 387
| style="background-color: #9FCADF" | Turtwig†
| style="background-color: #DCD677; border-left:2px solid grey" | 494
| style="background-color: #DCD677" | Victini♭
| style="background-color: #9FCADF; border-left:2px solid grey" | 650
| style="background-color: #9FCADF" | Chespin†
| style="background-color: #9FCADF; border-left:2px solid grey" | 722
| style="background-color: #9FCADF" | Rowlet†
| style="background-color: #9FCADF; border-left:2px solid grey" | 810
| style="background-color: #9FCADF" | Grookey†
| style="background-color: #9FCADF; border-left:2px solid grey" | 906
| style="background-color: #9FCADF" | Sprigatito†
|-
| style="border-left:2px solid grey" | 002
| Ivysaur
| style="border-left:2px solid grey" | 153
| Bayleef
| style="border-left:2px solid grey" | 253
| Grovyle
| style="border-left:2px solid grey" | 388
| Grotle
| style="background-color: #9FCADF; border-left:2px solid grey" | 495
| style="background-color: #9FCADF" | Snivy†
| style="border-left:2px solid grey" | 651
| Quilladin
| style="border-left:2px solid grey" | 723
| Dartrix
| style="border-left:2px solid grey" | 811
| Thwackey
| style="border-left:2px solid grey" | 907
| Floragato
|-
| style="border-left:2px solid grey" | 003
| Venusaur
| style="border-left:2px solid grey" | 154
| Meganium
| style="border-left:2px solid grey" | 254
| Sceptile
| style="border-left:2px solid grey" | 389
| Torterra
| style="border-left:2px solid grey" | 496
| Servine
| style="border-left:2px solid grey" | 652
| Chesnaught
| style="border-left:2px solid grey" | 724
| Decidueye
| style="border-left:2px solid grey" | 812
| Rillaboom
| style="border-left:2px solid grey" | 908
| Meowscarada
|-
| style="background-color: #9FCADF; border-left:2px solid grey" | 004
| style="background-color: #9FCADF" | Charmander†
| style="background-color: #9FCADF; border-left:2px solid grey" | 155
| style="background-color: #9FCADF" | Cyndaquil†
| style="background-color: #9FCADF; border-left:2px solid grey" | 255
| style="background-color: #9FCADF" | Torchic†
| style="background-color: #9FCADF; border-left:2px solid grey" | 390
| style="background-color: #9FCADF" | Chimchar†
| style="border-left:2px solid grey" | 497
| Serperior
| style="background-color: #9FCADF; border-left:2px solid grey" | 653
| style="background-color: #9FCADF" | Fennekin†
| style="background-color: #9FCADF; border-left:2px solid grey" | 725
| style="background-color: #9FCADF" | Litten†
| style="background-color: #9FCADF; border-left:2px solid grey" | 813
| style="background-color: #9FCADF" | Scorbunny†
| style="background-color: #9FCADF; border-left:2px solid grey" | 909
| style="background-color: #9FCADF" | Fuecoco†
|-
| style="border-left:2px solid grey" | 005
| Charmeleon
| style="border-left:2px solid grey" | 156
| Quilava
| style="border-left:2px solid grey" | 256
| Combusken
| style="border-left:2px solid grey" | 391
| Monferno
| style="background-color: #9FCADF; border-left:2px solid grey" | 498
| style="background-color: #9FCADF" | Tepig†
| style="border-left:2px solid grey" | 654
| Braixen
| style="border-left:2px solid grey" | 726
| Torracat
| style="border-left:2px solid grey" | 814
| Raboot
| style="border-left:2px solid grey" | 910
| Crocalor
|-
| style="border-left:2px solid grey" | 006
| Charizard
| style="border-left:2px solid grey" | 157
| Typhlosion
| style="border-left:2px solid grey" | 257
| Blaziken
| style="border-left:2px solid grey" | 392
| Infernape
| style="border-left:2px solid grey" | 499
| Pignite
| style="border-left:2px solid grey" | 655
| Delphox
| style="border-left:2px solid grey" | 727
| Incineroar
| style="border-left:2px solid grey" | 815
| Cinderace
| style="border-left:2px solid grey" | 911
| Skeledirge
|-
| style="background-color: #9FCADF; border-left:2px solid grey" | 007
| style="background-color: #9FCADF" | Squirtle†
| style="background-color: #9FCADF; border-left:2px solid grey" | 158
| style="background-color: #9FCADF" | Totodile†
| style="background-color: #9FCADF; border-left:2px solid grey" | 258
| style="background-color: #9FCADF" | Mudkip†
| style="background-color: #9FCADF; border-left:2px solid grey" | 393
| style="background-color: #9FCADF" | Piplup†
| style="border-left:2px solid grey" | 500
| Emboar
| style="background-color: #9FCADF; border-left:2px solid grey" | 656
| style="background-color: #9FCADF" | Froakie†
| style="background-color: #9FCADF; border-left:2px solid grey" | 728
| style="background-color: #9FCADF" | Popplio†
| style="background-color: #9FCADF; border-left:2px solid grey" | 816
| style="background-color: #9FCADF" | Sobble† 
| style="background-color: #9FCADF; border-left:2px solid grey" | 912
| style="background-color: #9FCADF" | Quaxly†
|-
| style="border-left:2px solid grey" | 008
| Wartortle
| style="border-left:2px solid grey" | 159
| Croconaw
| style="border-left:2px solid grey" | 259
| Marshtomp
| style="border-left:2px solid grey" | 394
| Prinplup
| style="background-color: #9FCADF; border-left:2px solid grey" | 501
| style="background-color: #9FCADF" | Oshawott†
| style="border-left:2px solid grey" | 657
| Frogadier
| style="border-left:2px solid grey" | 729
| Brionne
| style="border-left:2px solid grey" | 817
| Drizzile
| style="border-left:2px solid grey" | 913
| Quaxwell
|-
| style="border-left:2px solid grey" | 009
| Blastoise
| style="border-left:2px solid grey" | 160
| Feraligatr
| style="border-left:2px solid grey" | 260
| Swampert
| style="border-left:2px solid grey" | 395
| Empoleon
| style="border-left:2px solid grey" | 502
| Dewott
| style="border-left:2px solid grey" | 658
| Greninja
| style="border-left:2px solid grey" | 730
| Primarina
| style="border-left:2px solid grey" | 818
| Inteleon
| style="border-left:2px solid grey" | 914
| Quaquaval
|-
| style="border-left:2px solid grey" | 010
| Caterpie
| style="border-left:2px solid grey" | 161
| Sentret
| style="border-left:2px solid grey" | 261
| Poochyena
| style="border-left:2px solid grey" | 396
| Starly
| style="border-left:2px solid grey" | 503
| Samurott
| style="border-left:2px solid grey" | 659
| Bunnelby
| style="border-left:2px solid grey" | 731
| Pikipek
| style="border-left:2px solid grey" | 819
| Skwovet
| style="border-left:2px solid grey" | 915
| Lechonk
|-
| style="border-left:2px solid grey" | 011
| Metapod
| style="border-left:2px solid grey" | 162
| Furret
| style="border-left:2px solid grey" | 262
| Mightyena
| style="border-left:2px solid grey" | 397
| Staravia
| style="border-left:2px solid grey" | 504
| Patrat
| style="border-left:2px solid grey" | 660
| Diggersby
| style="border-left:2px solid grey" | 732
| Trumbeak
| style="border-left:2px solid grey" | 820
| Greedent
| style="border-left:2px solid grey" | 916
| Oinkologne
|-
| style="border-left:2px solid grey" | 012
| Butterfree
| style="border-left:2px solid grey" | 163
| Hoothoot
| style="border-left:2px solid grey" | 263
| Zigzagoon
| style="border-left:2px solid grey" | 398
| Staraptor
| style="border-left:2px solid grey" | 505
| Watchog
| style="border-left:2px solid grey" | 661
| Fletchling
| style="border-left:2px solid grey" | 733
| Toucannon
| style="border-left:2px solid grey" | 821
| Rookidee
| style="border-left:2px solid grey" | 917
| Tarountula
|-
| style="border-left:2px solid grey" | 013
| Weedle
| style="border-left:2px solid grey" | 164
| Noctowl
| style="border-left:2px solid grey" | 264
| Linoone
| style="border-left:2px solid grey" | 399
| Bidoof
| style="border-left:2px solid grey" | 506
| Lillipup
| style="border-left:2px solid grey" | 662
| Fletchinder
| style="border-left:2px solid grey" | 734
| Yungoos
| style="border-left:2px solid grey" | 822
| Corvisquire
| style="border-left:2px solid grey" | 918
| Spidops
|-
| style="border-left:2px solid grey" | 014
| Kakuna
| style="border-left:2px solid grey" | 165
| Ledyba
| style="border-left:2px solid grey" | 265
| Wurmple
| style="border-left:2px solid grey" | 400
| Bibarel
| style="border-left:2px solid grey" | 507
| Herdier
| style="border-left:2px solid grey" | 663
| Talonflame
| style="border-left:2px solid grey" | 735
| Gumshoos
| style="border-left:2px solid grey" | 823
| Corviknight
| style="border-left:2px solid grey" | 919
| Nymble
|-
| style="border-left:2px solid grey" | 015
| Beedrill
| style="border-left:2px solid grey" | 166
| Ledian
| style="border-left:2px solid grey" | 266
| Silcoon
| style="border-left:2px solid grey" | 401
| Kricketot
| style="border-left:2px solid grey" | 508
| Stoutland
| style="border-left:2px solid grey" | 664
| Scatterbug
| style="border-left:2px solid grey" | 736
| Grubbin
| style="border-left:2px solid grey" | 824
| Blipbug
| style="border-left:2px solid grey" | 920
| Lokix
|-
| style="border-left:2px solid grey" | 016
| Pidgey
| style="border-left:2px solid grey" | 167
| Spinarak
| style="border-left:2px solid grey" | 267
| Beautifly
| style="border-left:2px solid grey" | 402
| Kricketune
| style="border-left:2px solid grey" | 509
| Purrloin
| style="border-left:2px solid grey" | 665
| Spewpa
| style="border-left:2px solid grey" | 737
| Charjabug
| style="border-left:2px solid grey" | 825
| Dottler
| style="border-left:2px solid grey" | 921
| Pawmi
|-
| style="border-left:2px solid grey" | 017
| Pidgeotto
| style="border-left:2px solid grey" | 168
| Ariados
| style="border-left:2px solid grey" | 268
| Cascoon
| style="border-left:2px solid grey" | 403
| Shinx
| style="border-left:2px solid grey" | 510
| Liepard
| style="border-left:2px solid grey" | 666
| Vivillon
| style="border-left:2px solid grey" | 738
| Vikavolt
| style="border-left:2px solid grey" | 826
| Orbeetle
| style="border-left:2px solid grey" | 922
| Pawmo
|-
| style="border-left:2px solid grey" | 018
| Pidgeot
| style="border-left:2px solid grey" | 169
| Crobat
| style="border-left:2px solid grey" | 269
| Dustox
| style="border-left:2px solid grey" | 404
| Luxio
| style="border-left:2px solid grey" | 511
| Pansage
| style="border-left:2px solid grey" | 667
| Litleo
| style="border-left:2px solid grey" | 739
| Crabrawler
| style="border-left:2px solid grey" | 827
| Nickit
| style="border-left:2px solid grey" | 923
| Pawmot
|-
| style="border-left:2px solid grey" | 019
| Rattata
| style="border-left:2px solid grey" | 170
| Chinchou
| style="border-left:2px solid grey" | 270
| Lotad
| style="border-left:2px solid grey" | 405
| Luxray
| style="border-left:2px solid grey" | 512
| Simisage
| style="border-left:2px solid grey" | 668
| Pyroar
| style="border-left:2px solid grey" | 740
| Crabominable
| style="border-left:2px solid grey" | 828
| Thievul
| style="border-left:2px solid grey" | 924
| Tandemaus
|-
| style="border-left:2px solid grey" | 020
| Raticate
| style="border-left:2px solid grey" | 171
| Lanturn
| style="border-left:2px solid grey" | 271
| Lombre
| style="background-color: #F7D9D3; border-left:2px solid grey" | 406
| style="background-color: #F7D9D3"| Budew※
| style="border-left:2px solid grey" | 513
| Pansear
| style="border-left:2px solid grey" | 669
| Flabébé
| style="border-left:2px solid grey" | 741
| Oricorio
| style="border-left:2px solid grey" | 829
| Gossifleur
| style="border-left:2px solid grey" | 925
| Maushold
|-
| style="border-left:2px solid grey" | 021
| Spearow
| style="background-color: #F7D9D3; border-left:2px solid grey" | 172
| style="background-color: #F7D9D3" | Pichu※
| style="border-left:2px solid grey" | 272
| Ludicolo
| style="border-left:2px solid grey" | 407
| Roserade
| style="border-left:2px solid grey" | 514
| Simisear
| style="border-left:2px solid grey" | 670
| Floette
| style="border-left:2px solid grey" | 742
| Cutiefly
| style="border-left:2px solid grey" | 830
| Eldegoss
| style="border-left:2px solid grey" | 926
| Fidough
|-
| style="border-left:2px solid grey" | 022
| Fearow
| style="background-color: #F7D9D3; border-left:2px solid grey" | 173
| style="background-color: #F7D9D3"| Cleffa※
| style="border-left:2px solid grey" | 273
| Seedot
| style="background-color: #ccdfdc; border-left:2px solid grey" | 408
| style="background-color: #ccdfdc" | Cranidos~
| style="border-left:2px solid grey" | 515
| Panpour
| style="border-left:2px solid grey" | 671
| Florges
| style="border-left:2px solid grey" | 743
| Ribombee
| style="border-left:2px solid grey" | 831
| Wooloo
| style="border-left:2px solid grey" | 927
| Dachsbun
|-
| style="border-left:2px solid grey" |023
| Ekans
| style="background-color: #F7D9D3; border-left:2px solid grey" | 174
| style="background-color: #F7D9D3"| Igglybuff※
| style="border-left:2px solid grey" | 274
| Nuzleaf
| style="background-color: #ccdfdc; border-left:2px solid grey" | 409
| style="background-color: #ccdfdc" | Rampardos~
| style="border-left:2px solid grey" | 516
| Simipour
| style="border-left:2px solid grey" | 672
| Skiddo
| style="border-left:2px solid grey" | 744
| Rockruff
| style="border-left:2px solid grey" | 832
| Dubwool
| style="border-left:2px solid grey" | 928
| Smoliv
|-
| style="border-left:2px solid grey" | 024
| Arbok
| style="background-color: #F7D9D3; border-left:2px solid grey" | 175
| style="background-color: #F7D9D3"| Togepi※
| style="border-left:2px solid grey" | 275
| Shiftry
| style="background-color: #ccdfdc; border-left:2px solid grey" | 410
| style="background-color: #ccdfdc" | Shieldon~
| style="border-left:2px solid grey" | 517
| Munna
| style="border-left:2px solid grey" | 673
| Gogoat
| style="border-left:2px solid grey" | 745
| Lycanroc
| style="border-left:2px solid grey" | 833
| Chewtle
| style="border-left:2px solid grey" | 929
| Dolliv
|-
| style="background-color: #9FCADF; border-left:2px solid grey" | 025
| style="background-color: #9FCADF" | Pikachu
| style="border-left:2px solid grey" | 176
| Togetic
| style="border-left:2px solid grey" | 276
| Taillow
| style="background-color: #ccdfdc; border-left:2px solid grey" | 411
| style="background-color: #ccdfdc" | Bastiodon~
| style="border-left:2px solid grey" | 518
| Musharna
| style="border-left:2px solid grey" | 674
| Pancham
| style="border-left:2px solid grey" | 746
| Wishiwashi
| style="border-left:2px solid grey" | 834
| Drednaw
| style="border-left:2px solid grey" | 930
| Arboliva
|-
| style="border-left:2px solid grey" | 026
| Raichu
| style="border-left:2px solid grey" | 177
| Natu
| style="border-left:2px solid grey" | 277
| Swellow
| style="border-left:2px solid grey" | 412
| Burmy
| style="border-left:2px solid grey" | 519
| Pidove
| style="border-left:2px solid grey" | 675
| Pangoro
| style="border-left:2px solid grey" | 747
| Mareanie
| style="border-left:2px solid grey" | 835
| Yamper
| style="border-left:2px solid grey" | 931
| Squawkabilly
|-
| style="border-left:2px solid grey" | 027
| Sandshrew
| style="border-left:2px solid grey" | 178
| Xatu
| style="border-left:2px solid grey" | 278
| Wingull
| style="border-left:2px solid grey" | 413
| Wormadam
| style="border-left:2px solid grey" | 520
| Tranquill
| style="border-left:2px solid grey" | 676
| Furfrou
| style="border-left:2px solid grey" | 748
| Toxapex
| style="border-left:2px solid grey" | 836
| Boltund
| style="border-left:2px solid grey" | 932
| Nacli
|-
| style="border-left:2px solid grey" | 028
| Sandslash
| style="border-left:2px solid grey" | 179
| Mareep
| style="border-left:2px solid grey" | 279
| Pelipper
| style="border-left:2px solid grey" | 414
| Mothim
| style="border-left:2px solid grey" | 521
| Unfezant
| style="border-left:2px solid grey" | 677
| Espurr
| style="border-left:2px solid grey" | 749
| Mudbray
| style="border-left:2px solid grey" | 837
| Rolycoly
| style="border-left:2px solid grey" | 933
| Naclstack
|-
| style="border-left:2px solid grey" | 029
| Nidoran♀
| style="border-left:2px solid grey" | 180
| Flaaffy
| style="border-left:2px solid grey" | 280
| Ralts
| style="border-left:2px solid grey" | 415
| Combee
| style="border-left:2px solid grey" | 522
| Blitzle
| style="border-left:2px solid grey" | 678
| Meowstic
| style="border-left:2px solid grey" | 750
| Mudsdale
| style="border-left:2px solid grey" | 838
| Carkol
| style="border-left:2px solid grey" | 934
| Garganacl
|-
| style="border-left:2px solid grey" | 030
| Nidorina
| style="border-left:2px solid grey" | 181
| Ampharos
| style="border-left:2px solid grey" | 281
| Kirlia
| style="border-left:2px solid grey" | 416
| Vespiquen
| style="border-left:2px solid grey" | 523
| Zebstrika
| style="border-left:2px solid grey" | 679
| Honedge
| style="border-left:2px solid grey" | 751
| Dewpider
| style="border-left:2px solid grey" | 839
| Coalossal
| style="border-left:2px solid grey" | 935
| Charcadet
|-
| style="border-left:2px solid grey" | 031
| Nidoqueen
| style="border-left:2px solid grey" | 182
| Bellossom
| style="border-left:2px solid grey" | 282
| Gardevoir
| style="border-left:2px solid grey" | 417
| Pachirisu
| style="border-left:2px solid grey" | 524
| Roggenrola
| style="border-left:2px solid grey" | 680
| Doublade
| style="border-left:2px solid grey" | 752
| Araquanid
| style="border-left:2px solid grey" | 840
| Applin
| style="border-left:2px solid grey" | 936
| Armarouge
|-
| style="border-left:2px solid grey" | 032
| Nidoran♂
| style="border-left:2px solid grey" | 183
| Marill
| style="border-left:2px solid grey" | 283
| Surskit
| style="border-left:2px solid grey" | 418
| Buizel
| style="border-left:2px solid grey" | 525
| Boldore
| style="border-left:2px solid grey" | 681
| Aegislash
| style="border-left:2px solid grey" | 753
| Fomantis
| style="border-left:2px solid grey" | 841
| Flapple
| style="border-left:2px solid grey" | 937
| Ceruledge
|-
| style="border-left:2px solid grey" | 033
| Nidorino
| style="border-left:2px solid grey" | 184
| Azumarill
| style="border-left:2px solid grey" | 284
| Masquerain
| style="border-left:2px solid grey" | 419
| Floatzel
| style="border-left:2px solid grey" | 526
| Gigalith
| style="border-left:2px solid grey" | 682
| Spritzee
| style="border-left:2px solid grey" | 754
| Lurantis
| style="border-left:2px solid grey" | 842
| Appletun
| style="border-left:2px solid grey" | 938
| Tadbulb
|-
| style="border-left:2px solid grey" | 034
| Nidoking
| style="border-left:2px solid grey" | 185
| Sudowoodo
| style="border-left:2px solid grey" | 285
| Shroomish
| style="border-left:2px solid grey" | 420
| Cherubi
| style="border-left:2px solid grey" | 527
| Woobat
| style="border-left:2px solid grey" | 683
| Aromatisse
| style="border-left:2px solid grey" | 755
| Morelull
| style="border-left:2px solid grey" | 843
| Silicobra
| style="border-left:2px solid grey" | 939
| Bellibolt
|-
| style="border-left:2px solid grey" | 035
| Clefairy
| style="border-left:2px solid grey" | 186
| Politoed
| style="border-left:2px solid grey" | 286
| Breloom
| style="border-left:2px solid grey" | 421
| Cherrim
| style="border-left:2px solid grey" | 528
| Swoobat
| style="border-left:2px solid grey" | 684
| Swirlix
| style="border-left:2px solid grey" | 756
| Shiinotic
| style="border-left:2px solid grey" | 844
| Sandaconda
| style="border-left:2px solid grey" | 940
| Wattrel
|-
| style="border-left:2px solid grey" | 036
| Clefable
| style="border-left:2px solid grey" | 187
| Hoppip
| style="border-left:2px solid grey" | 287
| Slakoth
| style="border-left:2px solid grey" | 422
| Shellos
| style="border-left:2px solid grey" | 529
| Drilbur
| style="border-left:2px solid grey" | 685
| Slurpuff
| style="border-left:2px solid grey" | 757
| Salandit
| style="border-left:2px solid grey" | 845
| Cramorant
| style="border-left:2px solid grey" | 941
| Kilowattrel
|-
| style="border-left:2px solid grey" | 037
| Vulpix
| style="border-left:2px solid grey" | 188
| Skiploom
| style="border-left:2px solid grey" | 288
| Vigoroth
| style="border-left:2px solid grey" | 423
| Gastrodon
| style="border-left:2px solid grey" | 530
| Excadrill
| style="border-left:2px solid grey" | 686
| Inkay
| style="border-left:2px solid grey" | 758
| Salazzle
| style="border-left:2px solid grey" | 846
| Arrokuda
| style="border-left:2px solid grey" | 942
| Maschiff
|-
| style="border-left:2px solid grey" | 038
| Ninetales
| style="border-left:2px solid grey" | 189
| Jumpluff
| style="border-left:2px solid grey" | 289
| Slaking
| style="border-left:2px solid grey" | 424
| Ambipom
| style="border-left:2px solid grey" | 531
| Audino
| style="border-left:2px solid grey" | 687
| Malamar
| style="border-left:2px solid grey" | 759
| Stufful
| style="border-left:2px solid grey" | 847
| Barraskewda
| style="border-left:2px solid grey" | 943
| Mabosstiff
|-
| style="border-left:2px solid grey" | 039
| Jigglypuff
| style="border-left:2px solid grey" | 190
| Aipom
| style="border-left:2px solid grey" | 290
| Nincada
| style="border-left:2px solid grey" | 425
| Drifloon
| style="border-left:2px solid grey" | 532
| Timburr
| style="border-left:2px solid grey" | 688
| Binacle
| style="border-left:2px solid grey" | 760
| Bewear
| style="background-color: #F7D9D3; border-left:2px solid grey" | 848
| style="background-color: #F7D9D3"| Toxel※
| style="border-left:2px solid grey" | 944
| Shroodle
|-
| style="border-left:2px solid grey" | 040
| Wigglytuff
| style="border-left:2px solid grey" | 191
| Sunkern
| style="border-left:2px solid grey" | 291
| Ninjask
| style="border-left:2px solid grey" | 426
| Drifblim
| style="border-left:2px solid grey" | 533
| Gurdurr
| style="border-left:2px solid grey" | 689
| Barbaracle
| style="border-left:2px solid grey" | 761
| Bounsweet
| style="border-left:2px solid grey" | 849
| Toxtricity
| style="border-left:2px solid grey" | 945
| Grafaiai
|-
| style="border-left:2px solid grey" | 041
| Zubat
| style="border-left:2px solid grey" | 192
| Sunflora
| style="border-left:2px solid grey" | 292
| Shedinja
| style="border-left:2px solid grey" | 427
| Buneary
| style="border-left:2px solid grey" | 534
| Conkeldurr
| style="border-left:2px solid grey" | 690
| Skrelp
| style="border-left:2px solid grey" | 762
| Steenee
| style="border-left:2px solid grey" | 850
| Sizzlipede
| style="border-left:2px solid grey" | 946
| Bramblin
|-
| style="border-left:2px solid grey" | 042
| Golbat
| style="border-left:2px solid grey" | 193
| Yanma
| style="border-left:2px solid grey" | 293
| Whismur
| style="border-left:2px solid grey" | 428
| Lopunny
| style="border-left:2px solid grey" | 535
| Tympole
| style="border-left:2px solid grey" | 691
| Dragalge
| style="border-left:2px solid grey" | 763
| Tsareena
| style="border-left:2px solid grey" | 851
| Centiskorch
| style="border-left:2px solid grey" | 947
| Brambleghast
|-
| style="border-left:2px solid grey" | 043
| Oddish
| style="border-left:2px solid grey" | 194
| Wooper
| style="border-left:2px solid grey" | 294
| Loudred
| style="border-left:2px solid grey" | 429
| Mismagius
| style="border-left:2px solid grey" | 536
| Palpitoad
| style="border-left:2px solid grey" | 692
| Clauncher
| style="border-left:2px solid grey" | 764
| Comfey
| style="border-left:2px solid grey" | 852
| Clobbopus
| style="border-left:2px solid grey" | 948
| Toedscool
|-
| style="border-left:2px solid grey" | 044
| Gloom
| style="border-left:2px solid grey" | 195
| Quagsire
| style="border-left:2px solid grey" | 295
| Exploud
| style="border-left:2px solid grey" | 430
| Honchkrow
| style="border-left:2px solid grey" | 537
| Seismitoad
| style="border-left:2px solid grey" | 693
| Clawitzer
| style="border-left:2px solid grey" | 765
| Oranguru
| style="border-left:2px solid grey" | 853
| Grapploct
| style="border-left:2px solid grey" | 949
| Toedscruel
|-
| style="border-left:2px solid grey" | 045
| Vileplume
| style="border-left:2px solid grey" | 196
| Espeon
| style="border-left:2px solid grey" | 296
| Makuhita
| style="border-left:2px solid grey" | 431
| Glameow
| style="border-left:2px solid grey" | 538
| Throh
| style="border-left:2px solid grey" | 694
| Helioptile
| style="border-left:2px solid grey" | 766
| Passimian
| style="border-left:2px solid grey" | 854
| Sinistea
| style="border-left:2px solid grey" | 950
| Klawf
|-
| style="border-left:2px solid grey" | 046
| Paras
| style="border-left:2px solid grey" | 197
| Umbreon
| style="border-left:2px solid grey" | 297
| Hariyama
| style="border-left:2px solid grey" | 432
| Purugly
| style="border-left:2px solid grey" | 539
| Sawk
| style="border-left:2px solid grey" | 695
| Heliolisk
| style="border-left:2px solid grey" | 767
| Wimpod
| style="border-left:2px solid grey" | 855
| Polteageist
| style="border-left:2px solid grey" | 951
| Capsakid
|-
| style="border-left:2px solid grey" | 047
| Parasect
| style="border-left:2px solid grey" | 198
| Murkrow
| style="background-color: #F7D9D3; border-left:2px solid grey" | 298
| style="background-color: #F7D9D3"| Azurill※
| style="background-color: #F7D9D3; border-left:2px solid grey" | 433
| style="background-color: #F7D9D3"| Chingling※
| style="border-left:2px solid grey" | 540
| Sewaddle
| style="background-color: #ccdfdc; border-left:2px solid grey" | 696
| style="background-color: #ccdfdc" | Tyrunt~
| style="border-left:2px solid grey" | 768
| Golisopod
| style="border-left:2px solid grey" | 856
| Hatenna
| style="border-left:2px solid grey" | 952
| Scovillain
|-
| style="border-left:2px solid grey" | 048
| Venonat
| style="border-left:2px solid grey" | 199
| Slowking
| style="border-left:2px solid grey" | 299
| Nosepass
| style="border-left:2px solid grey" | 434
| Stunky
| style="border-left:2px solid grey" | 541
| Swadloon
| style="background-color: #ccdfdc; border-left:2px solid grey" | 697
| style="background-color: #ccdfdc" | Tyrantrum~
| style="border-left:2px solid grey" | 769
| Sandygast
| style="border-left:2px solid grey" | 857
| Hattrem
| style="border-left:2px solid grey" | 953
| Rellor
|-
| style="border-left:2px solid grey" | 049
| Venomoth
| style="border-left:2px solid grey" | 200
| Misdreavus
| style="border-left:2px solid grey" | 300
| Skitty
| style="border-left:2px solid grey" | 435
| Skuntank
| style="border-left:2px solid grey" | 542
| Leavanny
| style="background-color: #ccdfdc; border-left:2px solid grey" | 698
| style="background-color: #ccdfdc" | Amaura~
| style="border-left:2px solid grey" | 770
| Palossand
| style="border-left:2px solid grey" | 858
| Hatterene
| style="border-left:2px solid grey" | 954
| Rabsca
|-
| style="border-left:2px solid grey" | 050
| Diglett
| style="border-left:2px solid grey" | 201
| Unown
| style="border-left:2px solid grey" | 301
| Delcatty
| style="border-left:2px solid grey" | 436
| Bronzor
| style="border-left:2px solid grey" | 543
| Venipede
| style="background-color: #ccdfdc; border-left:2px solid grey" | 699
| style="background-color: #ccdfdc" |  Aurorus~
| style="border-left:2px solid grey" | 771
| Pyukumuku
| style="border-left:2px solid grey" | 859
| Impidimp
| style="border-left:2px solid grey" | 955
| Flittle
|-
| style="border-left:2px solid grey" | 051
| Dugtrio
| style="border-left:2px solid grey" | 202
| Wobbuffet
| style="border-left:2px solid grey" | 302
| Sableye
| style="border-left:2px solid grey" | 437
| Bronzong
| style="border-left:2px solid grey" | 544
| Whirlipede
| style="border-left:2px solid grey" | 700
| Sylveon
| style="background-color: #E89483; border-left:2px solid grey" | 772
| style="background-color: #E89483" | Type: Null‡
| style="border-left:2px solid grey" | 860
| Morgrem
| style="border-left:2px solid grey" | 956
| Espathra
|-
| style="border-left:2px solid grey" | 052
| Meowth
| style="border-left:2px solid grey" | 203
| Girafarig
| style="border-left:2px solid grey" | 303
| Mawile
| style="background-color: #F7D9D3; border-left:2px solid grey" | 438
| style="background-color: #F7D9D3"| Bonsly※
| style="border-left:2px solid grey" | 545
| Scolipede
| style="border-left:2px solid grey" | 701
| Hawlucha
| style="background-color: #E89483; border-left:2px solid grey" | 773
| style="background-color: #E89483" | Silvally‡
| style="border-left:2px solid grey" | 861
| Grimmsnarl
| style="border-left:2px solid grey" | 957
| Tinkatink
|-
| style="border-left:2px solid grey" | 053
| Persian
| style="border-left:2px solid grey" | 204
| Pineco
| style="border-left:2px solid grey" | 304
| Aron
| style="background-color: #F7D9D3; border-left:2px solid grey" | 439
| style="background-color: #F7D9D3"| Mime Jr.※
| style="border-left:2px solid grey" | 546
| Cottonee
| style="border-left:2px solid grey" | 702
| Dedenne
| style="border-left:2px solid grey" | 774
| Minior
| style="border-left:2px solid grey" | 862
| Obstagoon
| style="border-left:2px solid grey" | 958
| Tinkatuff
|-
| style="border-left:2px solid grey" | 054
| Psyduck
| style="border-left:2px solid grey" | 205
| Forretress
| style="border-left:2px solid grey" | 305
| Lairon
| style="background-color: #F7D9D3; border-left:2px solid grey" | 440
| style="background-color: #F7D9D3"| Happiny※
| style="border-left:2px solid grey" | 547
| Whimsicott
| style="border-left:2px solid grey" | 703
| Carbink
| style="border-left:2px solid grey" | 775
| Komala
| style="border-left:2px solid grey" | 863
| Perrserker
| style="border-left:2px solid grey" | 959
| Tinkaton
|-
| style="border-left:2px solid grey" | 055
| Golduck
| style="border-left:2px solid grey" | 206
| Dunsparce
| style="border-left:2px solid grey" | 306
| Aggron
| style="border-left:2px solid grey" | 441
| Chatot
| style="border-left:2px solid grey" | 548
| Petilil
| style="border-left:2px solid grey" | 704
| Goomy
| style="border-left:2px solid grey" | 776
| Turtonator
| style="border-left:2px solid grey" | 864
| Cursola
| style="border-left:2px solid grey" | 960
| Wiglett
|-
| style="border-left:2px solid grey" | 056
| Mankey
| style="border-left:2px solid grey" | 207
| Gligar
| style="border-left:2px solid grey" | 307
| Meditite
| style="border-left:2px solid grey" | 442
| Spiritomb
| style="border-left:2px solid grey" | 549
| Lilligant
| style="border-left:2px solid grey" | 705
| Sliggoo
| style="border-left:2px solid grey" | 777
| Togedemaru
| style="border-left:2px solid grey" | 865
| Sirfetch'd
| style="border-left:2px solid grey" | 961
| Wugtrio
|-
| style="border-left:2px solid grey" | 057
| Primeape
| style="border-left:2px solid grey" | 208
| Steelix
| style="border-left:2px solid grey" | 308
| Medicham
| style="border-left:2px solid grey" | 443
| Gible
| style="border-left:2px solid grey" | 550
| Basculin
| style="border-left:2px solid grey" | 706
|Goodra
| style="border-left:2px solid grey" | 778
| Mimikyu
| style="border-left:2px solid grey" | 866
| Mr. Rime
| style="border-left:2px solid grey" | 962
| Bombirdier
|-
| style="border-left:2px solid grey" | 058
| Growlithe
| style="border-left:2px solid grey" | 209
| Snubbull
| style="border-left:2px solid grey" | 309
| Electrike
| style="border-left:2px solid grey" | 444
| Gabite
| style="border-left:2px solid grey" | 551
| Sandile
| style="border-left:2px solid grey" | 707
| Klefki
| style="border-left:2px solid grey" | 779
| Bruxish
| style="border-left:2px solid grey" | 867
| Runerigus
| style="border-left:2px solid grey" | 963
| Finizen
|-
| style="border-left:2px solid grey" | 059
| Arcanine
| style="border-left:2px solid grey" | 210
| Granbull
| style="border-left:2px solid grey" | 310
| Manectric
| style="border-left:2px solid grey" | 445
| Garchomp
| style="border-left:2px solid grey" | 552
| Krokorok
| style="border-left:2px solid grey" | 708
| Phantump
| style="border-left:2px solid grey" | 780
| Drampa
| style="border-left:2px solid grey" | 868
| Milcery
| style="border-left:2px solid grey" | 964
| Palafin
|-
| style="border-left:2px solid grey" | 060
| Poliwag
| style="border-left:2px solid grey" | 211
| Qwilfish
| style="border-left:2px solid grey" | 311
| Plusle
| style="background-color: #F7D9D3; border-left:2px solid grey" | 446
| style="background-color: #F7D9D3"| Munchlax※
| style="border-left:2px solid grey" | 553
| Krookodile
| style="border-left:2px solid grey" | 709
| Trevenant
| style="border-left:2px solid grey" | 781
| Dhelmise
| style="border-left:2px solid grey" | 869
| Alcremie
| style="border-left:2px solid grey" | 965
| Varoom
|-
| style="border-left:2px solid grey" | 061
| Poliwhirl
| style="border-left:2px solid grey" | 212
| Scizor
| style="border-left:2px solid grey" | 312
| Minun
| style="background-color: #F7D9D3; border-left:2px solid grey" | 447
| style="background-color: #F7D9D3"| Riolu※
| style="border-left:2px solid grey" | 554
| Darumaka
| style="border-left:2px solid grey" | 710
| Pumpkaboo
| style="border-left:2px solid grey" | 782
| Jangmo-o
| style="border-left:2px solid grey" | 870
| Falinks
| style="border-left:2px solid grey" | 966
| Revavroom
|-
| style="border-left:2px solid grey" | 062
| Poliwrath
| style="border-left:2px solid grey" | 213
| Shuckle
| style="border-left:2px solid grey" | 313
| Volbeat
| style="border-left:2px solid grey" | 448
| Lucario
| style="border-left:2px solid grey" | 555
| Darmanitan
| style="border-left:2px solid grey" | 711
| Gourgeist
| style="border-left:2px solid grey" | 783
| Hakamo-o
| style="border-left:2px solid grey" | 871
| Pincurchin
| style="border-left:2px solid grey" | 967
| Cyclizar
|-
| style="border-left:2px solid grey" | 063
| Abra
| style="border-left:2px solid grey" | 214
| Heracross
| style="border-left:2px solid grey" | 314
| Illumise
| style="border-left:2px solid grey" | 449
| Hippopotas
| style="border-left:2px solid grey" | 556
| Maractus
| style="border-left:2px solid grey" | 712
| Bergmite
| style="border-left:2px solid grey" | 784
| Kommo-o
| style="border-left:2px solid grey" | 872
| Snom
| style="border-left:2px solid grey" | 968
| Orthworm
|-
| style="border-left:2px solid grey" | 064
| Kadabra
| style="border-left:2px solid grey" | 215
| Sneasel
| style="border-left:2px solid grey" | 315
| Roselia
| style="border-left:2px solid grey" | 450
| Hippowdon
| style="border-left:2px solid grey" | 557
| Dwebble
| style="border-left:2px solid grey" | 713
| Avalugg
| style="background-color: #E89483; border-left:2px solid grey" | 785
| style="background-color: #E89483" | Tapu Koko‡
| style="border-left:2px solid grey" | 873
| Frosmoth
| style="border-left:2px solid grey" | 969
| Glimmet
|-
| style="border-left:2px solid grey" | 065
| Alakazam
| style="border-left:2px solid grey" | 216
| Teddiursa
| style="border-left:2px solid grey" | 316
| Gulpin
| style="border-left:2px solid grey" | 451
| Skorupi
| style="border-left:2px solid grey" | 558
| Crustle
| style="border-left:2px solid grey" | 714
| Noibat
| style="background-color: #E89483; border-left:2px solid grey" | 786
| style="background-color: #E89483" | Tapu Lele‡
| style="border-left:2px solid grey" | 874
| Stonjourner
| style="border-left:2px solid grey" | 970
| Glimmora
|-
| style="border-left:2px solid grey" | 066
| Machop
| style="border-left:2px solid grey" | 217
| Ursaring
| style="border-left:2px solid grey" | 317
| Swalot
| style="border-left:2px solid grey" | 452
| Drapion
| style="border-left:2px solid grey" | 559
| Scraggy
| style="border-left:2px solid grey" | 715
| Noivern
| style="background-color: #E89483; border-left:2px solid grey" | 787
| style="background-color: #E89483" | Tapu Bulu‡
| style="border-left:2px solid grey" | 875
| Eiscue
| style="border-left:2px solid grey" | 971
| Greavard
|-
| style="border-left:2px solid grey" | 067
| Machoke
| style="border-left:2px solid grey" | 218
| Slugma
| style="border-left:2px solid grey" | 318
| Carvanha
| style="border-left:2px solid grey" | 453
| Croagunk
| style="border-left:2px solid grey" | 560
| Scrafty
| style="background-color: #E89483; border-left:2px solid grey" | 716
| style="background-color: #E89483" | Xerneas‡
| style="background-color: #E89483; border-left:2px solid grey" | 788
| style="background-color: #E89483" | Tapu Fini‡
| style="border-left:2px solid grey" | 876
| Indeedee
| style="border-left:2px solid grey" | 972
| Houndstone
|-
| style="border-left:2px solid grey" | 068
| Machamp
| style="border-left:2px solid grey" | 219
| Magcargo
| style="border-left:2px solid grey" | 319
| Sharpedo
| style="border-left:2px solid grey" | 454
| Toxicroak
| style="border-left:2px solid grey" | 561
| Sigilyph
| style="background-color: #E89483; border-left:2px solid grey" | 717
| style="background-color: #E89483" | Yveltal‡
| style="background-color: #E89483; border-left:2px solid grey" | 789
| style="background-color: #E89483" | Cosmog‡
| style="border-left:2px solid grey" | 877
| Morpeko
| style="border-left:2px solid grey" | 973
| Flamigo
|-
| style="border-left:2px solid grey" | 069
| Bellsprout
| style="border-left:2px solid grey" | 220
| Swinub
| style="border-left:2px solid grey" | 320
| Wailmer
| style="border-left:2px solid grey" | 455
| Carnivine
| style="border-left:2px solid grey" | 562
| Yamask
| style="background-color: #E89483; border-left:2px solid grey" | 718
| style="background-color: #E89483" | Zygarde‡
| style="background-color: #E89483; border-left:2px solid grey" | 790
| style="background-color: #E89483" | Cosmoem‡
| style="border-left:2px solid grey" | 878
| Cufant
| style="border-left:2px solid grey" | 974
| Cetoddle
|-
| style="border-left:2px solid grey" | 070
| Weepinbell
| style="border-left:2px solid grey" | 221
| Piloswine
| style="border-left:2px solid grey" | 321
| Wailord
| style="border-left:2px solid grey" | 456
| Finneon
| style="border-left:2px solid grey" | 563
| Cofagrigus
| style="background-color: #DCD677; border-left:2px solid grey" | 719
| style="background-color: #DCD677" | Diancie♭
| style="background-color: #E89483; border-left:2px solid grey" | 791
| style="background-color: #E89483" | Solgaleo‡
| style="border-left:2px solid grey" | 879
| Copperajah
| style="border-left:2px solid grey" | 975
| Cetitan
|-
| style="border-left:2px solid grey" | 071
| Victreebel
| style="border-left:2px solid grey" | 222
| Corsola
| style="border-left:2px solid grey" | 322
| Numel
| style="border-left:2px solid grey" | 457
| Lumineon
| style="background-color: #ccdfdc; border-left:2px solid grey" | 564
| style="background-color: #ccdfdc" | Tirtouga~
| style="background-color: #DCD677; border-left:2px solid grey" | 720
| style="background-color: #DCD677" | Hoopa♭
| style="background-color: #E89483; border-left:2px solid grey" | 792
| style="background-color: #E89483" | Lunala‡
| style="background-color: #ccdfdc; border-left:2px solid grey" | 880
| style="background-color: #ccdfdc" | Dracozolt~
| style="border-left:2px solid grey" | 976
| Veluza
|-
| style="border-left:2px solid grey" | 072
| Tentacool
| style="border-left:2px solid grey" | 223
| Remoraid
| style="border-left:2px solid grey" | 323
| Camerupt
| style="background-color: #F7D9D3; border-left:2px solid grey" | 458
| style="background-color: #F7D9D3"| Mantyke※
| style="background-color: #ccdfdc; border-left:2px solid grey" | 565
| style="background-color: #ccdfdc" | Carracosta~
| style="background-color: #DCD677; border-left:2px solid grey" | 721
| style="background-color: #DCD677" | Volcanion♭
| style="background-color: #B7A3C3; border-left:2px solid grey" | 793
| style="background-color: #B7A3C3" | Nihilego♯
| style="background-color: #ccdfdc; border-left:2px solid grey" | 881
| style="background-color: #ccdfdc" | Arctozolt~
| style="border-left:2px solid grey" | 977
| Dondozo
|-
| style="border-left:2px solid grey" | 073
| Tentacruel
| style="border-left:2px solid grey" | 224
| Octillery
| style="border-left:2px solid grey" | 324
| Torkoal
| style="border-left:2px solid grey" | 459
| Snover
| style="background-color: #ccdfdc; border-left:2px solid grey" | 566
| style="background-color: #ccdfdc" | Archen~
| colspan="2" rowspan="84" style="background: #ececec; vertical-align: middle; font-size: smaller; text-align: center;" class="table-na" sort="bottom" style="border-left:2px solid grey" | No additional Pokémon
| style="background-color: #B7A3C3; border-left:2px solid grey" | 794
| style="background-color: #B7A3C3" | Buzzwole♯
| style="background-color: #ccdfdc; border-left:2px solid grey" | 882
| style="background-color: #ccdfdc" | Dracovish~
| style="border-left:2px solid grey" | 978
| Tatsugiri
|-
| style="border-left:2px solid grey" | 074
| Geodude
| style="border-left:2px solid grey" | 225
| Delibird
| style="border-left:2px solid grey" | 325
| Spoink
| style="border-left:2px solid grey" | 460
| Abomasnow
| style="background-color: #ccdfdc; border-left:2px solid grey" | 567
| style="background-color: #ccdfdc" | Archeops~
| style="background-color: #B7A3C3; border-left:2px solid grey" | 795
| style="background-color: #B7A3C3" | Pheromosa♯
| style="background-color: #ccdfdc; border-left:2px solid grey" | 883
| style="background-color: #ccdfdc" | Arctovish~
| style="border-left:2px solid grey" | 979
| Annihilape
|-
| style="border-left:2px solid grey" | 075
| Graveler
| style="border-left:2px solid grey" | 226
| Mantine
| style="border-left:2px solid grey" | 326
| Grumpig
| style="border-left:2px solid grey" | 461
| Weavile
| style="border-left:2px solid grey" | 568
| Trubbish
| style="background-color: #B7A3C3; border-left:2px solid grey" | 796
| style="background-color: #B7A3C3" | Xurkitree♯
| style="border-left:2px solid grey" | 884
| Duraludon
| style="border-left:2px solid grey" | 980
| Clodsire
|-
| style="border-left:2px solid grey" | 076
| Golem
| style="border-left:2px solid grey" | 227
| Skarmory
| style="border-left:2px solid grey" | 327
| Spinda
| style="border-left:2px solid grey" | 462
| Magnezone
| style="border-left:2px solid grey" | 569
| Garbodor
| style="background-color: #B7A3C3; border-left:2px solid grey" | 797
| style="background-color: #B7A3C3" | Celesteela♯
| style="border-left:2px solid grey" | 885
| Dreepy
| style="border-left:2px solid grey" | 981
| Farigiraf
|-
| style="border-left:2px solid grey" | 077
| Ponyta
| style="border-left:2px solid grey" | 228
| Houndour
| style="border-left:2px solid grey" | 328
| Trapinch
| style="border-left:2px solid grey" | 463
| Lickilicky
| style="border-left:2px solid grey" | 570
| Zorua
| style="background-color: #B7A3C3; border-left:2px solid grey" | 798
| style="background-color: #B7A3C3" | Kartana♯
| style="border-left:2px solid grey" | 886
| Drakloak
| style="border-left:2px solid grey" | 982
| Dudunsparce
|-
| style="border-left:2px solid grey" | 078
| Rapidash
| style="border-left:2px solid grey" | 229
| Houndoom
| style="border-left:2px solid grey" | 329
| Vibrava
| style="border-left:2px solid grey" | 464
| Rhyperior
| style="border-left:2px solid grey" | 571
| Zoroark
| style="background-color: #B7A3C3; border-left:2px solid grey" | 799
| style="background-color: #B7A3C3" | Guzzlord♯
| style="border-left:2px solid grey" | 887
| Dragapult
| style="border-left:2px solid grey" | 983
| Kingambit
|-
| style="border-left:2px solid grey" | 079
| Slowpoke
| style="border-left:2px solid grey" | 230
| Kingdra
| style="border-left:2px solid grey" | 330
| Flygon
| style="border-left:2px solid grey" | 465
| Tangrowth
| style="border-left:2px solid grey" | 572
| Minccino
| style="background-color: #E89483; border-left:2px solid grey" | 800
| style="background-color: #E89483" | Necrozma‡
| style="background-color: #E89483; border-left:2px solid grey" | 888
| style="background-color: #E89483" | Zacian‡
| style="background-color: #d4f2ce; border-left:2px solid grey" | 984
| style="background-color: #d4f2ce" | Great Tusk§
|-
| style="border-left:2px solid grey" | 080
| Slowbro
| style="border-left:2px solid grey" | 231
| Phanpy
| style="border-left:2px solid grey" | 331
| Cacnea
| style="border-left:2px solid grey" | 466
| Electivire
| style="border-left:2px solid grey" | 573
| Cinccino
| style="background-color: #DCD677; border-left:2px solid grey" | 801
| style="background-color: #DCD677" | Magearna♭
| style="background-color: #E89483; border-left:2px solid grey" | 889
| style="background-color: #E89483" | Zamazenta‡
| style="background-color: #d4f2ce; border-left:2px solid grey" | 985
| style="background-color: #d4f2ce" | Scream Tail§
|-
| style="border-left:2px solid grey" | 081
| Magnemite
| style="border-left:2px solid grey" | 232
| Donphan
| style="border-left:2px solid grey" | 332
| Cacturne
| style="border-left:2px solid grey" | 467
| Magmortar
| style="border-left:2px solid grey" | 574
| Gothita
| style="background-color: #DCD677; border-left:2px solid grey" | 802
| style="background-color: #DCD677" | Marshadow♭
| style="background-color: #E89483; border-left:2px solid grey" | 890
| style="background-color: #E89483" | Eternatus‡
| style="background-color: #d4f2ce; border-left:2px solid grey" | 986
| style="background-color: #d4f2ce" | Brute Bonnet§
|-
| style="border-left:2px solid grey" | 082
| Magneton
| style="border-left:2px solid grey" | 233
| Porygon2
| style="border-left:2px solid grey" | 333
| Swablu
| style="border-left:2px solid grey" | 468
| Togekiss
| style="border-left:2px solid grey" | 575
| Gothorita
| style="background-color: #B7A3C3; border-left:2px solid grey" | 803
| style="background-color: #B7A3C3" | Poipole♯
| style="background-color: #E89483; border-left:2px solid grey" | 891
| style="background-color: #E89483" | Kubfu‡
| style="background-color: #d4f2ce; border-left:2px solid grey" | 987
| style="background-color: #d4f2ce" | Flutter Mane§
|-
| style="border-left:2px solid grey" | 083
| Farfetch'd
| style="border-left:2px solid grey" | 234
| Stantler
| style="border-left:2px solid grey" | 334
| Altaria
| style="border-left:2px solid grey" | 469
| Yanmega
| style="border-left:2px solid grey" | 576
| Gothitelle
| style="background-color: #B7A3C3; border-left:2px solid grey" | 804
| style="background-color: #B7A3C3" | Naganadel♯
| style="background-color: #E89483; border-left:2px solid grey" | 892
| style="background-color: #E89483" | Urshifu‡
| style="background-color: #d4f2ce; border-left:2px solid grey" | 988
| style="background-color: #d4f2ce" | Slither Wing§
|-
| style="border-left:2px solid grey" | 084
| Doduo
| style="border-left:2px solid grey" | 235
| Smeargle
| style="border-left:2px solid grey" | 335
| Zangoose
| style="border-left:2px solid grey" | 470
| Leafeon
| style="border-left:2px solid grey" | 577
| Solosis
| style="background-color: #B7A3C3; border-left:2px solid grey" | 805
| style="background-color: #B7A3C3" | Stakataka♯
| style="background-color: #DCD677; border-left:2px solid grey" | 893
| style="background-color: #DCD677" | Zarude♭
| style="background-color: #d4f2ce; border-left:2px solid grey" | 989
| style="background-color: #d4f2ce" | Sandy Shocks§
|-
| style="border-left:2px solid grey" | 085
| Dodrio
| style="background-color: #F7D9D3; border-left:2px solid grey" | 236
| style="background-color: #F7D9D3"| Tyrogue※
| style="border-left:2px solid grey" | 336
| Seviper
| style="border-left:2px solid grey" | 471
| Glaceon
| style="border-left:2px solid grey" | 578
| Duosion
| style="background-color: #B7A3C3; border-left:2px solid grey" | 806
| style="background-color: #B7A3C3" | Blacephalon♯
| style="background-color: #E89483; border-left:2px solid grey" | 894
| style="background-color: #E89483" | Regieleki‡
| style="background-color: #d4f2ce; border-left:2px solid grey" | 990
| style="background-color: #d4f2ce" | Iron Treads§
|-
| style="border-left:2px solid grey" | 086
| Seel
| style="border-left:2px solid grey" | 237
| Hitmontop
| style="border-left:2px solid grey" | 337
| Lunatone
| style="border-left:2px solid grey" | 472
| Gliscor
| style="border-left:2px solid grey" | 579
| Reuniclus
| style="background-color: #DCD677; border-left:2px solid grey" | 807
| style="background-color: #DCD677" | Zeraora♭
| style="background-color: #E89483; border-left:2px solid grey" | 895
| style="background-color: #E89483" | Regidrago‡
| style="background-color: #d4f2ce; border-left:2px solid grey" | 991
| style="background-color: #d4f2ce" | Iron Bundle§
|-
| style="border-left:2px solid grey" | 087
| Dewgong
| style="background-color: #F7D9D3; border-left:2px solid grey" | 238
| style="background-color: #F7D9D3"| Smoochum※
| style="border-left:2px solid grey" | 338
| Solrock
| style="border-left:2px solid grey" | 473
| Mamoswine
| style="border-left:2px solid grey" | 580
| Ducklett
| style="background-color: #DCD677; border-left:2px solid grey" | 808
| style="background-color: #DCD677" | Meltan♭
| style="background-color: #E89483; border-left:2px solid grey" | 896
| style="background-color: #E89483" | Glastrier‡
| style="background-color: #d4f2ce; border-left:2px solid grey" | 992
| style="background-color: #d4f2ce" | Iron Hands§
|-
| style="border-left:2px solid grey" | 088
| Grimer
| style="background-color: #F7D9D3; border-left:2px solid grey" | 239
| style="background-color: #F7D9D3"| Elekid※
| style="border-left:2px solid grey" | 339
| Barboach
| style="border-left:2px solid grey" | 474
| Porygon-Z
| style="border-left:2px solid grey" | 581
| Swanna
| style="background-color: #DCD677; border-left:2px solid grey" | 809
| style="background-color: #DCD677" | Melmetal♭
| style="background-color: #E89483; border-left:2px solid grey" | 897
| style="background-color: #E89483" | Spectrier‡
| style="background-color: #d4f2ce; border-left:2px solid grey" | 993
| style="background-color: #d4f2ce" | Iron Jugulis§
|-
| style="border-left:2px solid grey" | 089
| Muk
| style="background-color: #F7D9D3; border-left:2px solid grey" | 240
| style="background-color: #F7D9D3"| Magby※
| style="border-left:2px solid grey" | 340
| Whiscash
| style="border-left:2px solid grey" | 475
| Gallade
| style="border-left:2px solid grey" | 582
| Vanillite
|colspan="2" rowspan="68" style="background: #ececec; vertical-align: middle; font-size: smaller; text-align: center;" class="table-na" sort="bottom" style="border-left:2px solid grey" | No additional Pokémon
|style="background-color: #E89483; border-left:2px solid grey" | 898
|style="background-color: #E89483" | Calyrex‡
| style="background-color: #d4f2ce; border-left:2px solid grey" | 994
| style="background-color: #d4f2ce" | Iron Moth§
|-
| style="border-left:2px solid grey" | 090
| Shellder
| style="border-left:2px solid grey" | 241
| Miltank
| style="border-left:2px solid grey" | 341
| Corphish
| style="border-left:2px solid grey" | 476
| Probopass
| style="border-left:2px solid grey" | 583
| Vanillish
| style="border-left:2px solid grey" | 899
| Wyrdeer
| style="background-color: #d4f2ce; border-left:2px solid grey" | 995
| style="background-color: #d4f2ce" | Iron Thorns§
|-
| style="border-left:2px solid grey" | 091
| Cloyster
| style="border-left:2px solid grey" | 242
| Blissey
| style="border-left:2px solid grey" | 342
| Crawdaunt
| style="border-left:2px solid grey" | 477
| Dusknoir
| style="border-left:2px solid grey" | 584
| Vanilluxe
| style="border-left:2px solid grey" | 900
| Kleavor
| style="border-left:2px solid grey" | 996
| Frigibax
|-
| style="border-left:2px solid grey" | 092
| Gastly
| style="background-color: #E89483; border-left:2px solid grey" | 243
| style="background-color: #E89483" | Raikou‡
| style="border-left:2px solid grey" | 343
| Baltoy
| style="border-left:2px solid grey" | 478
| Froslass
| style="border-left:2px solid grey" | 585
| Deerling
| style="border-left:2px solid grey" | 901
| Ursaluna
| style="border-left:2px solid grey" | 997
| Arctibax
|-
| style="border-left:2px solid grey" | 093
| Haunter
| style="background-color: #E89483; border-left:2px solid grey" | 244
| style="background-color: #E89483" | Entei‡
| style="border-left:2px solid grey" | 344
| Claydol
| style="border-left:2px solid grey" | 479
| Rotom
| style="border-left:2px solid grey" | 586
| Sawsbuck
| style="border-left:2px solid grey" | 902
| Basculegion
| style="border-left:2px solid grey" | 998
| Baxcalibur
|-
| style="border-left:2px solid grey" | 094
| Gengar
| style="background-color: #E89483; border-left:2px solid grey" | 245
| style="background-color: #E89483" | Suicune‡
| style="background-color: #ccdfdc; border-left:2px solid grey" | 345
| style="background-color: #ccdfdc" | Lileep~
| style="background-color: #E89483; border-left:2px solid grey" | 480
| style="background-color: #E89483" | Uxie‡
| style="border-left:2px solid grey" | 587
| Emolga
| style="border-left:2px solid grey" | 903
| Sneasler
| style="border-left:2px solid grey" | 999
| Gimmighoul
|-
| style="border-left:2px solid grey" | 095
| Onix
| style="border-left:2px solid grey" | 246
| Larvitar
| style="background-color: #ccdfdc; border-left:2px solid grey" | 346
| style="background-color: #ccdfdc" | Cradily~
| style="background-color: #E89483; border-left:2px solid grey" | 481
| style="background-color: #E89483" | Mesprit‡
| style="border-left:2px solid grey" | 588
| Karrablast
| style="border-left:2px solid grey" | 904
| Overqwil
| style="border-left:2px solid grey" | 1000
| Gholdengo
|-
| style="border-left:2px solid grey" | 096
| Drowzee
| style="border-left:2px solid grey" | 247
| Pupitar
| style="background-color: #ccdfdc; border-left:2px solid grey" | 347
| style="background-color: #ccdfdc" | Anorith~
| style="background-color: #E89483; border-left:2px solid grey" | 482
| style="background-color: #E89483" | Azelf‡
| style="border-left:2px solid grey" | 589
| Escavalier
| style="background-color: #E89483; border-left:2px solid grey" | 905
| style="background-color: #E89483" | Enamorus‡
|style="background-color: #E89483; border-left:2px solid grey" | 1001
|style="background-color: #E89483" | Wo-Chien‡
|-
| style="border-left:2px solid grey" | 097
| Hypno
| style="border-left:2px solid grey" | 248
| Tyranitar
| style="background-color: #ccdfdc; border-left:2px solid grey" | 348
| style="background-color: #ccdfdc" | Armaldo~
| style="background-color: #E89483; border-left:2px solid grey" | 483
| style="background-color: #E89483" | Dialga‡
| style="border-left:2px solid grey" | 590
| Foongus
| colspan="2" rowspan="60" style="background: #ececec; vertical-align: middle; font-size: smaller; text-align: center;" class="table-na" sort="bottom" style="border-left:2px solid grey" | No additional Pokémon
|style="background-color: #E89483; border-left:2px solid grey" | 1002
|style="background-color: #E89483" | Chien-Pao‡
|-
| style="border-left:2px solid grey" | 098
| Krabby
| style="background-color: #E89483; border-left:2px solid grey" | 249
| style="background-color: #E89483" | Lugia‡
| style="border-left:2px solid grey" | 349
| Feebas
| style="background-color: #E89483; border-left:2px solid grey" | 484
| style="background-color: #E89483" | Palkia‡
| style="border-left:2px solid grey" | 591
| Amoonguss
|style="background-color: #E89483; border-left:2px solid grey" | 1003
|style="background-color: #E89483" | Ting-Lu‡
|-
| style="border-left:2px solid grey" | 099
| Kingler
| style="background-color: #E89483; border-left:2px solid grey" | 250
| style="background-color: #E89483" | Ho-oh‡
| style="border-left:2px solid grey" | 350
| Milotic
| style="background-color: #E89483; border-left:2px solid grey" | 485
| style="background-color: #E89483" | Heatran‡
| style="border-left:2px solid grey" | 592
| Frillish
|style="background-color: #E89483; border-left:2px solid grey" | 1004
|style="background-color: #E89483" | Chi-Yu‡
|-
| style="border-left:2px solid grey" | 100
| Voltorb
| style="background-color: #DCD677; border-left:2px solid grey" | 251
| style="background-color: #DCD677" | Celebi♭
| style="border-left:2px solid grey" | 351
| Castform
| style="background-color: #E89483; border-left:2px solid grey" | 486
| style="background-color: #E89483" | Regigigas‡
| style="border-left:2px solid grey" | 593
| Jellicent
| style="background-color: #d4f2ce; border-left:2px solid grey" | 1005
| style="background-color: #d4f2ce" | Roaring Moon§
|-
| style="border-left:2px solid grey" | 101
| Electrode
| colspan="2" rowspan="56" style="background: #ececec; vertical-align: middle; font-size: smaller; text-align: center;" class="table-na" sort="bottom" style="border-left:2px solid grey" | No additional Pokémon
| style="border-left:2px solid grey" | 352
| Kecleon
| style="background-color: #E89483; border-left:2px solid grey" | 487
| style="background-color: #E89483" | Giratina‡
| style="border-left:2px solid grey" | 594
| Alomomola
| style="background-color: #d4f2ce; border-left:2px solid grey" | 1006
| style="background-color: #d4f2ce" | Iron Valiant§
|-
| style="border-left:2px solid grey" | 102
| Exeggcute
| style="border-left:2px solid grey" | 353
| Shuppet
| style="background-color: #E89483; border-left:2px solid grey" | 488
| style="background-color: #E89483" | Cresselia‡
| style="border-left:2px solid grey" | 595
| Joltik
| style="border-left:2px solid grey; background-color: #E89483" | 1007
| style="background-color: #E89483" | Koraidon‡
|-
| style="border-left:2px solid grey" | 103
| Exeggutor
| style="border-left:2px solid grey" | 354
| Banette
| style="background-color: #DCD677; border-left:2px solid grey" | 489
| style="background-color: #DCD677" | Phione♭
| style="border-left:2px solid grey" | 596
| Galvantula
| style="border-left:2px solid grey; background-color: #E89483" | 1008
| style="background-color: #E89483" | Miraidon‡
|-
| style="border-left:2px solid grey" | 104
| Cubone
| style="border-left:2px solid grey" | 355
| Duskull
| style="background-color: #DCD677; border-left:2px solid grey" | 490
| style="background-color: #DCD677" | Manaphy♭
| style="border-left:2px solid grey" | 597
| Ferroseed
| style="background-color: #d4f2ce; border-left:2px solid grey" |(1009)
| style="background-color: #d4f2ce" | Walking Wake§
|-
| style="border-left:2px solid grey" | 105
| Marowak
| style="border-left:2px solid grey" | 356
| Dusclops
| style="background-color: #DCD677; border-left:2px solid grey" | 491
| style="background-color: #DCD677" | Darkrai ♭
| style="border-left:2px solid grey" | 598
| Ferrothorn
| style="background-color: #d4f2ce; border-left:2px solid grey" | (1010)
| style="background-color: #d4f2ce" |Iron Leaves§
|-
| style="border-left:2px solid grey" | 106
| Hitmonlee
| style="border-left:2px solid grey" | 357
| Tropius
| style="background-color: #DCD677; border-left:2px solid grey" | 492
| style="background-color: #DCD677" | Shaymin♭
| style="border-left:2px solid grey" | 599
| Klink
| style="border-left:2px solid grey" | N/A
| Okidogi
|-
| style="border-left:2px solid grey" | 107
| Hitmonchan
| style="border-left:2px solid grey" | 358
| Chimecho
| style="background-color: #DCD677; border-left:2px solid grey" | 493
| style="background-color: #DCD677" | Arceus♭
| style="border-left:2px solid grey" | 600
| Klang
| style="border-left:2px solid grey" | N/A
| Munkidori
|-
| style="border-left:2px solid grey" | 108
| Lickitung
| style="border-left:2px solid grey" | 359
| Absol
| colspan="2" rowspan="49" style="background: #ececec; vertical-align: middle; font-size: smaller; text-align: center;" class="table-na" sort="bottom" style="border-left:2px solid grey" | No additional Pokémon
| style="border-left:2px solid grey" | 601
| Klinklang
| style="border-left:2px solid grey" | N/A
| Fezandipiti
|-
| style="border-left:2px solid grey" | 109
| Koffing
| style="background-color: #F7D9D3; border-left:2px solid grey" | 360
| style="background-color: #F7D9D3"| Wynaut※
| style="border-left:2px solid grey" | 602
| Tynamo
| style="border-left:2px solid grey" | N/A
| Ogerpon
|-
| style="border-left:2px solid grey" | 110
| Weezing
| style="border-left:2px solid grey" | 361
| Snorunt
| style="border-left:2px solid grey" | 603
| Eelektrik
| style="border-left:2px solid grey" | N/A
| Terapagos
|-
| style="border-left:2px solid grey" | 111
| Rhyhorn
| style="border-left:2px solid grey" | 362
| Glalie
| style="border-left:2px solid grey" | 604
| Eelektross
|colspan="2" rowspan="46" style="border-left:2px solid grey" |No additional Pokémon
|-
| style="border-left:2px solid grey" | 112
| Rhydon
| style="border-left:2px solid grey" | 363
| Spheal
| style="border-left:2px solid grey" | 605
| Elgyem
|-
| style="border-left:2px solid grey" | 113
| Chansey
| style="border-left:2px solid grey" | 364
| Sealeo
| style="border-left:2px solid grey" | 606
| Beheeyem
|-
| style="border-left:2px solid grey" | 114
| Tangela
| style="border-left:2px solid grey" | 365
| Walrein
| style="border-left:2px solid grey" | 607
| Litwick
|-
| style="border-left:2px solid grey" | 115
| Kangaskhan
| style="border-left:2px solid grey" | 366
| Clamperl
| style="border-left:2px solid grey" | 608
| Lampent
|-
| style="border-left:2px solid grey" | 116
| Horsea
| style="border-left:2px solid grey" | 367
| Huntail
| style="border-left:2px solid grey" | 609
| Chandelure
|-
| style="border-left:2px solid grey" | 117
| Seadra
| style="border-left:2px solid grey" | 368
| Gorebyss
| style="border-left:2px solid grey" | 610
| Axew
|-
| style="border-left:2px solid grey" | 118
| Goldeen
| style="border-left:2px solid grey" | 369
| Relicanth
| style="border-left:2px solid grey" | 611
| Fraxure
|-
| style="border-left:2px solid grey" | 119
| Seaking
| style="border-left:2px solid grey" | 370
| Luvdisc
| style="border-left:2px solid grey" | 612
| Haxorus
|-
| style="border-left:2px solid grey" | 120
| Staryu
| style="border-left:2px solid grey" | 371
| Bagon
| style="border-left:2px solid grey" | 613
| Cubchoo
|-
| style="border-left:2px solid grey" | 121
| Starmie
| style="border-left:2px solid grey" | 372
| Shelgon
| style="border-left:2px solid grey" | 614
| Beartic
|-
| style="border-left:2px solid grey" | 122
| Mr. Mime
| style="border-left:2px solid grey" | 373
| Salamence
| style="border-left:2px solid grey" | 615
| Cryogonal
|-
| style="border-left:2px solid grey" | 123
| Scyther
| style="border-left:2px solid grey" | 374
| Beldum
| style="border-left:2px solid grey" | 616
| Shelmet
|-
| style="border-left:2px solid grey" | 124
| Jynx
| style="border-left:2px solid grey" | 375
| Metang
| style="border-left:2px solid grey" | 617
| Accelgor
|-
| style="border-left:2px solid grey" | 125
| Electabuzz
| style="border-left:2px solid grey" | 376
| Metagross
| style="border-left:2px solid grey" | 618
| Stunfisk
|-
| style="border-left:2px solid grey" | 126
| Magmar
| style="background-color: #E89483; border-left:2px solid grey" | 377
| style="background-color: #E89483" | Regirock‡
| style="border-left:2px solid grey" | 619
| Mienfoo
|-
| style="border-left:2px solid grey" | 127
| Pinsir
| style="background-color: #E89483; border-left:2px solid grey" | 378
| style="background-color: #E89483" | Regice‡
| style="border-left:2px solid grey" | 620
| Mienshao
|-
| style="border-left:2px solid grey" | 128
| Tauros
| style="background-color: #E89483; border-left:2px solid grey" | 379
| style="background-color: #E89483" | Registeel‡
| style="border-left:2px solid grey" | 621
| Druddigon
|-
| style="border-left:2px solid grey" | 129
| Magikarp
| style="background-color: #E89483; border-left:2px solid grey" | 380
| style="background-color: #E89483" | Latias‡
| style="border-left:2px solid grey" | 622
| Golett
|-
| style="border-left:2px solid grey" | 130
| Gyarados
| style="background-color: #E89483; border-left:2px solid grey" | 381
| style="background-color: #E89483" | Latios‡
| style="border-left:2px solid grey" | 623
| Golurk
|-
| style="border-left:2px solid grey" | 131
| Lapras
| style="background-color: #E89483; border-left:2px solid grey" | 382
| style="background-color: #E89483" | Kyogre‡
| style="border-left:2px solid grey" | 624
| Pawniard
|-
| style="border-left:2px solid grey" | 132
| Ditto
| style="background-color: #E89483; border-left:2px solid grey" | 383
| style="background-color: #E89483" | Groudon‡
| style="border-left:2px solid grey" | 625
| Bisharp
|-
| style="background-color: #9FCADF; border-left:2px solid grey" | 133
| style="background-color: #9FCADF" | Eevee
| style="background-color: #E89483; border-left:2px solid grey" | 384
| style="background-color: #E89483" | Rayquaza‡
| style="border-left:2px solid grey" | 626
| Bouffalant
|-
| style="border-left:2px solid grey" | 134
| Vaporeon
| style="background-color: #DCD677; border-left:2px solid grey" | 385
| style="background-color: #DCD677" | Jirachi♭
| style="border-left:2px solid grey" | 627
| Rufflet
|-
| style="border-left:2px solid grey" | 135
| Jolteon
| style="background-color: #DCD677; border-left:2px solid grey" | 386
| style="background-color: #DCD677" | Deoxys♭{{efn|name=Mythical|Certain mythical Pokémon are obtainable permanently obtainable in-game, being Deoxys in Omega Ruby and Alpha Sapphire, Magearna in Sun, Moon, [[Pokémon Ultra Sun and Ultra Moon|Ultra Sun and Ultra Moon']], Celebi in the Virtual Console version of Crystal, Keldeo in Sword and Shield's The Crown Tundraexpansion, Mew, Jirachi, and Arceus in Brilliant Diamond and Shining Pearl, and Manaphy, Phione, Shaymin, Darkrai, and Arceus in Legends: Arceus.}}
| style="border-left:2px solid grey" | 628
| Braviary
|-
| style="border-left:2px solid grey" | 136
| Flareon
| colspan="2" rowspan="21" style="background: #ececec; vertical-align: middle; font-size: smaller; text-align: center;" class="table-na" sort="bottom" style="border-left:2px solid grey" | No additional Pokémon
| style="border-left:2px solid grey" | 629
| Vullaby
|-
| style="border-left:2px solid grey" | 137
| Porygon
| style="border-left:2px solid grey" | 630
| Mandibuzz
|-
| style="background-color: #ccdfdc; border-left:2px solid grey" | 138
| style="background-color: #ccdfdc" | Omanyte~
| style="border-left:2px solid grey" | 631
| Heatmor
|-
| style="background-color: #ccdfdc; border-left:2px solid grey" | 139
| style="background-color: #ccdfdc" | Omastar~
| style="border-left:2px solid grey" | 632
| Durant
|-
| style="background-color: #ccdfdc; border-left:2px solid grey" | 140
| style="background-color: #ccdfdc" | Kabuto~
| style="border-left:2px solid grey" | 633
| Deino
|-
| style="background-color: #ccdfdc; border-left:2px solid grey" | 141
| style="background-color: #ccdfdc" | Kabutops~
| style="border-left:2px solid grey" | 634
| Zweilous
|-
| style="background-color: #ccdfdc; border-left:2px solid grey" | 142
| style="background-color: #ccdfdc" | Aerodactyl~
| style="border-left:2px solid grey" | 635
| Hydreigon
|-
| style="border-left:2px solid grey" | 143
| Snorlax
| style="border-left:2px solid grey" | 636
| Larvesta
|-
| style="background-color: #E89483; border-left:2px solid grey" | 144
| style="background-color: #E89483" | Articuno‡
| style="border-left:2px solid grey" | 637
| Volcarona
|-
| style="background-color: #E89483; border-left:2px solid grey" | 145
| style="background-color: #E89483" | Zapdos‡
| style="background-color: #E89483; border-left:2px solid grey" | 638
| style="background-color: #E89483" | Cobalion‡
|-
| style="background-color: #E89483; border-left:2px solid grey" | 146
| style="background-color: #E89483" | Moltres‡
| style="background-color: #E89483; border-left:2px solid grey" | 639
| style="background-color: #E89483" | Terrakion‡
|-
| style="border-left:2px solid grey" | 147
| Dratini
| style="background-color: #E89483; border-left:2px solid grey" | 640
| style="background-color: #E89483" | Virizion‡
|-
| style="border-left:2px solid grey" | 148
| Dragonair
| style="background-color: #E89483; border-left:2px solid grey" | 641
| style="background-color: #E89483" | Tornadus‡
|-
| style="border-left:2px solid grey" | 149
| Dragonite
| style="background-color: #E89483; border-left:2px solid grey" | 642
| style="background-color: #E89483" | Thundurus‡
|-
| style="background-color: #E89483; border-left:2px solid grey" | 150
| style="background-color: #E89483" | Mewtwo‡
| style="background-color: #E89483; border-left:2px solid grey" | 643
| style="background-color: #E89483" | Reshiram‡
|-
| style="background-color: #DCD677; border-left:2px solid grey" | 151
| style="background-color: #DCD677" | Mew♭
| style="background-color: #E89483; border-left:2px solid grey" | 644
| style="background-color: #E89483" | Zekrom‡
|-
| colspan="2" rowspan="5" style="background: #ececec; vertical-align: middle; font-size: smaller; text-align: center;" class="table-na" sort="bottom" style="border-left:2px solid grey" | No additional Pokémon
| style="background-color: #E89483; border-left:2px solid grey" | 645
| style="background-color: #E89483" | Landorus‡
|-
| style="background-color: #E89483; border-left:2px solid grey" | 646
| style="background-color: #E89483" | Kyurem‡
|-
| style="background-color: #DCD677; border-left:2px solid grey" | 647
| style="background-color: #DCD677" | Keldeo♭
|-
| style="background-color: #DCD677; border-left:2px solid grey" | 648
| style="background-color: #DCD677" | Meloetta♭
|-
| style="background-color: #DCD677; border-left:2px solid grey" | 649
| style="background-color: #DCD677" | Genesect♭
|}

Glitch species
In the Game Boy Pokémon games, Pokémon Red, Green, Blue, and Yellow'', players were able to access a set of 105 glitch Pokémon. These species were not designed by the games' designers but could be encountered via the use of several glitches. Among them is a glitch dubbed MissingNo., which became highly notorious.

Notes

References

External links

 Pokémon official Pokédex
 Pokémon species on Bulbapedia
 Pokémon India Official Pokédex